Roman Chentsov (born 16 January 1978) is a Kazakhstani water polo player. He competed in the men's tournament at the 2000 Summer Olympics.

References

1978 births
Living people
Kazakhstani male water polo players
Olympic water polo players of Kazakhstan
Water polo players at the 2000 Summer Olympics
Sportspeople from Almaty
Asian Games medalists in water polo
Water polo players at the 1998 Asian Games
Asian Games gold medalists for Kazakhstan
Medalists at the 1998 Asian Games
20th-century Kazakhstani people